Group B of the 1994 FIFA World Cup was one of six groups of four teams competing at the 1994 World Cup in the United States. The first match was played June 19, 1994 and the final games took place simultaneously on June 28, 1994.

The group consisted of Brazil, Russia, Cameroon and Sweden. Brazil won the group and Sweden finished second.

Standings

Matches
All times local (EDT/UTC–4, CDT/UTC–5, PDT/UTC–7)

Cameroon vs Sweden

Brazil vs Russia

Brazil vs Cameroon

Sweden vs Russia

Russia vs Cameroon

Brazil vs Sweden

References

Group B
Group
Sweden at the 1994 FIFA World Cup
Russia at the 1994 FIFA World Cup
Cameroon at the 1994 FIFA World Cup